Khoshk Rud (also Romanized as Khoshk Rūd; also known as Khoshkeh Rūd) is a village in Khoshk Rud Rural District, Rudbast District, Babolsar County, Mazandaran Province, Iran. At the 2006 census, its population was 1,450, in 368 families.

References 

Populated places in Babolsar County